Urdd Gobaith Cymru (known as the Urdd) is a national voluntary youth organisation, which claimed over 56,000 members in 2019 aged between 8 and 25 years old. It provides opportunities for children and young people across Wales to take part in a range of experiences through the medium of Welsh. The Urdd turned 100 on 25 January 2022 and celebrated by breaking 2 Guinness World Records.

Urdd Gobaith Cymru also has 5 residential centres for children and young people across Wales.

The main aim is to ensure that all young people in Wales are given the opportunity, through the medium of Welsh, to play a constructive role in the community, developing personal and social skills'. Up till 2019, 4 million children and young people have engaged with the Urdd in one form or another.

The Urdd National Eisteddfod (Welsh: Eisteddfod Genedlaethol Urdd Gobaith Cymru or Eisteddfod Genedlaethol yr Urdd) is an annual Welsh-language youth festival of literature, music and performing arts organised by Urdd Gobaith Cymru. Arguably Europe's largest youth festival, it is usually held during the last week of May, coinciding with schools' half term holiday.

History
Urdd Gobaith Cymru (or 'Urdd Gobaith Cymru Fach') was established by Sir Ifan ab Owen Edwards in 1922. His aim was to protect the Welsh language in a world where the English language dominated every aspect of life outside the home and the chapel. In an issue of the magazine ‘Cymru’r Plant’ in 1922 Sir Ifan said, "These days, in many villages, and in most towns in Wales, children play and read in English. They forget that they are Welsh."

He appealed to the children of Wales to join a new organization that offered opportunities through the medium of Welsh, and as a result, Urdd Gobaith Cymru was established.

Nearly a century later, Urdd Gobaith Cymru, the main youth organization in Wales, has over 56,000 members, belonging to over 900 branches who take part in a wide range of activities. The work is carried out with the help of 260 staff and 10,000 volunteers. The Chief Executive appointed in 2015 to take the movement forward to the 2022 centenary left in 2017 after Trustees took action following the expression of a lack of faith in her ability by staff. The current Chief Executive of Urdd Gobaith Cymru is Sian Lewis.

It had to adapt to the COVID-19 pandemic as an organisation that thrives over face to face activities like sporting and cultural events. It had estimated that due to the pandemic it would make a £3.8 million loss and an overall £14m reduction in income. It had to cut jobs in the organisation by half, over 160.

Mistar Urdd 

Mistar Urdd (Mr Urdd) is the Urdd mascot, based on the Urdd Gobaith Cymru logo and badge. Mistar Urdd has his own song 'Hey Mistar Urdd'.

On 25 January 2022, the date that the organisation celebrated its 100th birthday, it broke 2 Guinness World Records for the most videos uploaded to twitter and Facebook of people singing the same song in an hour.

Eisteddfod yr Urdd 

The Urdd National Eisteddfod (Welsh: Eisteddfod Genedlaethol Urdd Gobaith Cymru or Eisteddfod Genedlaethol yr Urdd) is an annual Welsh-language youth festival of literature, music and performing arts organised by Urdd Gobaith Cymru. Arguably Europe's largest youth festival, it is usually held during the last week of May, coinciding with schools' half term holiday. The location is decided a few years before hand and alternate between north and south Wales.

The Eisteddfod consists of competitive singing, recitation, art, composition, dance and instrumental events for contestants aged between 7 and 24 years. Regional qualifying heats are held in advance around Wales.

In 2019, the Eisteddfod yr Urdd was held in Cardiff Bay. In 2020 and 2021, it was planned to be held in Denbigh and Llandovery respectfully but were postponed due to the COVID-19 pandemic. Instead an online event was done called 'Eisteddfod T'. The postponed Denbigh Eisteddfod in 2022 will have a free entry.

Sports

The Urdd's Sports Department hosts a wide range of community sports clubs and national sporting events for children and young people through the medium of Welsh. In 2019 boys were banned at short notice from participating in netball at the Urdd National Sports Festival.

The Sports Department, supported by Sport Wales, now employs 20 staff and trains over 1,000 volunteers annually. This has enabled the organisation to offer regular activities for children and young people, with 150 sports clubs held weekly across the country, and over 11,000 children attending.

Residential centres 

They have said that 47,000 people have visited the Urdd Camps annually. In 2018, over 2 million young people have attending one or more of the Urdd residential Centres. The aim of the centres is to create spaces that offer opportunities for children, young people and adults to live, teach and socialize in a safe and welcoming Welsh environment. In 2019 £5.5 million was allocated to Glan-Llyn and Llangrannog by the Welsh Government to develop the centres.

The Urdd offers residential experiences through its 5 residential centres:
 Gwersyll Llangrannog, Ceredigion, providing recreational activities, including horse riding and skiing 
 Gwersyll Glan-llyn, near Bala, Gwynedd, offering water sports; 
 Gwersyll Caerdydd located in Cardiff Bay 
 Pentre Ifan, Pembrokeshire, a centre for environmental and wellbeing experiences; 
 Tŷ Kisbodak Ház in Hungary offers young people of Wales an international experience.

Peace and goodwill message 
Every year since 1922, the children and young people of Wales have written and sent a Message of Peace and Goodwill to the children and young people of the world on Goodwill Day, 18 May.

Since 1955, Urdd Gobaith Cymru has been responsible for arranging for the message to be written and shared each year

References

External links
Official website in English
Official website in Welsh

Education in Wales
Clubs and societies in Wales
Youth organisations based in Wales